The 2023 UEFA Women's Champions League Final will be the final match of the 2022–23 UEFA Women's Champions League, the 22nd season of Europe's premier women's club football tournament organised by UEFA, and the 14th season since it was renamed from the UEFA Women's Cup to the UEFA Women's Champions League. The match will be played at the Philips Stadion in Eindhoven, Netherlands on 3 June 2023.

Venue
The Philips Stadion was selected as the final host by the UEFA Executive Committee during their meeting in Amsterdam, Netherlands on 2 March 2020.

The match is the first UEFA Women's Cup/Champions League final to be held in the Netherlands. It is also the fourth UEFA club competition final to be held at the stadium, having hosted two UEFA Cup/Europa League finals (the 1978 second leg and in 2006) and the 1988 European Super Cup second leg. The stadium was also a venue at UEFA Euro 2000, where it hosted three group stage matches.

Match

Details
The "home" team (for administrative purposes) will be determined by an additional draw held on 10 February 2023, 13:30 CET (after the quarter-final and semi-final draws), at the UEFA headquarters in Nyon, Switzerland.

See also
2023 UEFA Champions League Final
2023 UEFA Europa League Final
2023 UEFA Europa Conference League Final
2023 UEFA Super Cup

References

External links

2023
Final
Scheduled association football competitions
June 2023 sports events in Europe
2022–23 in Dutch women's football
International club association football competitions hosted by the Netherlands
International women's association football competitions hosted by the Netherlands
2023 UEFA Women's Champions League Final
2023 UEFA Women's Champions League Final